The cute cat theory of digital activism is a theory concerning Internet activism, Web censorship, and "cute cats" (a term used for any low-value, but popular online activity) developed by Ethan Zuckerman in 2008. It posits that most people are not interested in activism; instead, they want to use the web for mundane activities, including surfing for pornography and lolcats ("cute cats"). The tools that they develop for that (such as Facebook, Flickr, Blogger, Twitter, and similar platforms) are very useful to social movement activists because they may lack resources to develop dedicated tools themselves. This, in turn, makes the activists more immune to reprisals by governments than if they were using a dedicated activism platform, because shutting down a popular public platform provokes a larger public outcry than shutting down an obscure one.

The Internet and censorship
Zuckerman states that "Web 1.0 was invented to allow physicists to share research papers. Web 2.0 was created to allow people to share pictures of cute cats." Zuckerman says that if a tool passes "cute cat" purposes, and is widely used for low-value purposes, it can be and likely is used for online activism, too.

If the government chooses to shut down such generic tools, it will hurt people's ability to "look at cute cats online", spreading dissent and encouraging the activists' cause.

Chinese model
According to Zuckerman, internet censorship in the People's Republic of China, which relies on its own, self-censored, Web 2.0 sites, is able to circumvent the cute-cat problem because the government is able to provide people with access to cute-cat content on domestic, self-censored sites while blocking access to Western sites, which are less popular in China than in many other places worldwide.

"Sufficiently usable read/write platforms will attract porn and activists. If there's no porn, the tool doesn't work. If there are no activists, it doesn't work well," Zuckerman has stated.

See also 

 Collateral freedom
 Bread and circuses
 Digital utopianism
 Arab Spring
 Twitter Revolution
 Cats and the Internet

References

External links
,

Internet-based activism
Technology in society
Internet humor
Cats in popular culture